Lequille  is a community in the Canadian province of Nova Scotia, located in  Annapolis County. It is on Nova Scotia Trunk 8 at the foot of the South Mountain, midway between Annapolis Royal to the northwest and Highway 101 (Exit 22) to the south, approximately  distant.  its population was 182, a decline of 18.0% since 2016.

Lequille is the site of the first water-powered mill to be built north of Mexico. It was constructed in 1607 by Poutrincourt and today a plaque commemorates this National Historic Event. Nearby is the LeQuille Mill which was built in the 1880s to manufacture decorative moldings, casings and door and window frames. It was one of the last mills in the province to be powered by a water turbine, not being converted to electricity until 1960. It is a Provincial Heritage Property. The 13MW Lequille Hydroelectric System on the Allain River was commissioned in 1968 and underwent a $4 million upgrade in 2017.

Demographics 

Notable residents 
 Arthur Kennedy, actor

References

External links
 Nova Scotia Transportation and Infrastructure Renewal Webcam

Communities in Annapolis County, Nova Scotia
Designated places in Nova Scotia